Mount George is a locality in the Mid-Coast Council of New South Wales.

Mount George Public School opened in October 1874. It had an enrolment of 25 in 2015.

The Mount George Village Markets are held on the fourth Saturday of each month.

Heritage listings
Mount George has a number of heritage-listed sites, including:
 North Coast railway: Mount George Rail Bridge over Manning River

References

Localities in New South Wales
Suburbs of Mid-Coast Council